Tijana Bogdanović (born 5 May 1998) is a Serbian taekwondo athlete. She considers fellow taekwondo practitioner Milica Mandić as her idol.

Career
Bogdanović pursued her interest in taekwondo at the age of four, and started actively competing since 2004. She pursued her higher studies at the Singidunum University in the field of psychology.

She represented Serbia at the 2014 Summer Youth Olympics in the women's 49kg event. She clinched a bronze medal in the women's flyweight event during the 2015 World Taekwondo Championships. She claimed a silver after losing to England's Charlie Maddock in the women's 48kg event during the 2015 European Games. She was awarded the Best Young Athlete of Serbia in 2015.

She won a gold medal at the 2016 European Taekwondo Championships, but failed to defend the title two years later in Kazan, claiming the bronze there. She made her Olympic debut at the age of 18 as a schoolgirl during the 2016 Summer Olympics and she competed in the women's 49 kg category, where she clinched a silver medal. She was also the flagbearer for Serbia at the 2016 Summer Olympics during the closing ceremony. She was awarded the Sportswoman of the Year by the Olympic Committee of Serbia in 2016 following her success at the 2016 Rio Olympics.

She was knocked out of quarterfinal in the women's bantamweight event at the 2017 World Taekwondo Championships. She also reached round of 32 in the women's bantamweight event at the 2019 World Taekwondo Championships. She defeated China's Wu Jingyu to claim gold medal at the 2019 World Taekwondo Grand Prix.

She also represented Serbia at the 2020 Summer Olympics in the women's 49 kg category and won a bronze medal.

She won one of the bronze medals in the women's bantamweight event at the 2022 World Taekwondo Championships held in Guadalajara, Mexico.

Personal life
Bogdanović lives in Belgrade, Serbia.

References

External links

 

Serbian female taekwondo practitioners
1998 births
Living people
Sportspeople from Kruševac
Taekwondo practitioners at the 2014 Summer Youth Olympics
Taekwondo practitioners at the 2015 European Games
European Games silver medalists for Serbia
European Games medalists in taekwondo
Olympic taekwondo practitioners of Serbia
Taekwondo practitioners at the 2016 Summer Olympics
Medalists at the 2016 Summer Olympics
Olympic silver medalists for Serbia
Olympic medalists in taekwondo
European champions for Serbia
Universiade medalists in taekwondo
Universiade gold medalists for Serbia
World Taekwondo Championships medalists
European Taekwondo Championships medalists
Medalists at the 2017 Summer Universiade
Taekwondo practitioners at the 2020 Summer Olympics
Medalists at the 2020 Summer Olympics
Olympic bronze medalists for Serbia
21st-century Serbian women